Vena may refer to:

People
Cornel Vena (1932–2017), Romanian Olympic modern pentathlete
Gary Vena, American academic
Ryan Vena (born 1977), American arena football player
Vena, a diminutive of the Russian male first name Avenir
Vena, a diminutive of the Russian female first name Avenira
Vena, a diminutive of the Russian male first name Aventin
Vena, a diminutive of the Russian female first name Aventina
Vena, a variant of the female given name Slavena

Places
Vena, Sweden
Vena, Calabria, Italy

Other uses
Vena (album), by Coldrain, 2015
Vena (group), an American bachata music group
Vena (Hindu king), in Hindu mythology
Vena Records, a defunct American record label
Virtual Enterprise Network Architecture (VENA), Avaya cloud computing architecture
2S31 Vena, a Russian self-propelled mortar system

See also

Vena cava, a large vein in the human body